The Perfume of the Lady in Black (French: Le parfum de la dame en noir) is a 1908 mystery novel by the French writer Gaston Leroux. It is the second in the series of books featuring the fictional detective Joseph Rouletabille, preceded by The Mystery of the Yellow Room.

Adaptations
The novel has been adapted into film on several occasions including 
 The Perfume of the Lady in Black (1914)
 The Perfume of the Lady in Black (1931)
 The Perfume of the Lady in Black (1949)
 Il profumo della signora in nero (1974)
 The Perfume of the Lady in Black (2005)

References

Bibliography
 Hall, Ann C. Phantom Variations: The Adaptations of Gaston Leroux's Phantom of the Opera, 1925 to the Present. McFarland, 2009.

1908 French novels
French mystery novels
Novels by Gaston Leroux
French novels adapted into films
French detective novels